An Argonaut is a hero in Greek mythology.

Argonaut or Argonauts may also refer to:

Transportation 
 Argonaut, a 1961 yacht build by Trojan Yachts
 Argonaut (submarine), a class of submarines built by engineer Simon Lake
 , several submarines of the United States Navy
 , several ships of the Royal Navy
 , a cargo ship
 Argonaut (train), a train operated between Los Angeles and New Orleans
 Argonaut (aircraft), a variant of the Canadair North Star airliner
 Argonaut (automobile), an American automobile manufactured from 1959 to 1963

Companies 
 Argonaut Games, a British video game company
 Argonaut Mine, a defunct gold mine in Jackson, California
 Argonaut Resources, Australian mining company drilling for minerals at Lake Torrens, South Australia

Publications 
 The Argonaut, a former literary journal based in San Francisco
The Argonaut, the student newspaper of the University of Idaho
The Argonaut, a community newspaper in Los Angeles published by Southland Publishing
The Argonauts, a 2015 book by Maggie Nelson

Sports
 Argonauts F.C., an amateur football club based in London
 Argonaut Rowing Club, a rowing club in Toronto, Ontario
 Toronto Argonauts, a team in the Canadian Football League
 Antwerp Argonauts, an amateur American football team based in Antwerp, Belgium

Other uses 
 Argonaut (animal), pelagic octopuses of the genus Argonauta
 Argonaut Conference, the code name for the Yalta Conference, a 1945 wartime meeting between Franklin D. Roosevelt, Winston Churchill, and Joseph Stalin
 Argonaut, a person who took part in the California Gold Rush
 Argonaut, a member of the Argonauts Club, an Australian children's radio program
 Argonauts of Saint Nicholas, a military order in Naples
 Argonaut class reactor, a type of small nuclear research reactor
 Argonaut Island, local name Ulleungdo, a South Korean island
 VFA-147, a United States Navy squadron
 Argonaut Building, an office building in Detroit, Michigan
 "Argonaut", code name assigned to Ron "Captain Clarinet" Peterson in the comic book series PS238
 Argonaut, a fictional spaceship in the anime series Heroic Age

See also

 Argonaute, a family of proteins
 French ship Argonaute, several French Navy ships
Argonotes, the unofficial band of the Toronto Argonauts
Dragonaut: The Resonance, an anime series
Uronautes, a dubious genus of extinct plesiosaur